Is this a Pigeon? is an Internet meme and memorable quote of the protagonist character from the 1990s Japanese anime TV series The Brave Fighter of Sun Fighbird scene where the humanoid character mistakes a butterfly as a pigeon. The image was originally posted on Tumblr and later the meme spread with other variations.

Origin 
It originates from Yutaro Katori, a human android made by professor Hiroshi Amano, who misidentifies a butterfly as a pigeon while studying terrestrial nature in a scene from Season 1, Episode 3 of  The Brave Fighter of Sun Fighbird, which first aired in Japan in February 1991.

History 
In 2011, a scene from the third episode of the first season in which Yutaro sees a butterfly while speaking to Inspector Satsuda and asks "is this a pigeon?" was uploaded to Tumblr, spawning many variations and becoming a popular meme. The meme had a resurgence in 2018. On June 27th, 2013, BuzzFeed highlighted the meme in their compilation article titled "27 Subtitles That Have Gone Awesomely Wrong." In 2018, the resurgence of meme appeared on Twitter. In 2021, the meme was also used in The Mary Sue's article.

 Reception Mashable described it as a new Distracted boyfriend meme of 2018. PinkNews claimed that the meme explained about being transgender and proud, they also included the meme on their "best gay memes" and "bisexual meme" articles. The Daily Dot described it as the best meme template of 2018, while Thrillist described it as the dankest memes of the 2010s. Vice'' claimed that the meme helps "demystify the process of dealing with depression and other mental health issues."

References 

Internet memes introduced in 2011
Film and television memes
Internet memes